William Nelson Austin (January 28, 1903 – December 28, 1993) was a Canadian-American film editor. He was nominated for an Academy Award in the category Best Film Editing for the film Flat Top. Austin died in December 1993 in Los Angeles, California, at the age of 90.

Selected filmography 
 Flat Top (1952)
Sabu and the Magic Ring (1957)

References

External links 

1903 births
1993 deaths
People from Nanaimo
Canadian emigrants to the United States
American film editors
Canadian film editors